The list of shipwrecks in February 1915 includes ships sunk, foundered, grounded, or otherwise lost during February 1915.

1 February

2 February

3 February

4 February

5 February

6 February

7 February

8 February

11 February

12 February

13 February

14 February

15 February

16 February

17 February

18 February

19 February

20 February

21 February

22 February

23 February

24 February

25 February

27 February

Unknown date

References

1915-02
 02